Taniwha, in Māori mythology, are beings that live in deep pools in rivers, dark caves, or in the sea. 

Taniwha may also refer to:

Taniwha Cove, Couzens Bay, Antarctica
USS Taniwha (SP-129), a U.S. Navy patrol boat 1917–1919
Graneledone taniwha, species of the genus of octopus Graneledone
Northland Rugby Union, whose official team nickname is the Taniwha

See also
Taniwhasaurus, an extinct genus of carnivorous marine lizards
Tukumana Te Taniwha (1862–1941), a New Zealand tribal leader